Lorraine Copeland (born Elizabeth Lorraine Adie, 1921April 2013) was a British archaeologist specialising in the Palaeolithic period of the Near East. She was a secret agent with the Special Operations Executive during World War II.

Early life
In 1921, Copeland was born as Elizabeth Lorraine Adie in Edinburgh, Scotland. Her father was a neurosurgeon on Harley Street in London, and she was privately educated at Wycombe Abbey girls' school in Buckinghamshire.

Special Operations Executive
Copeland worked for British Intelligence during the Second World War, in the Special Operations Executive. She met her American husband, Miles Copeland, Jr., during this period, when he was based in the UK undertaking counter-intelligence for the US Army Counter Intelligence Corps. They married on 25 September 1942 and soon afterwards Miles' work took them to the Near East, particularly Syria, Lebanon and Egypt, and it was whilst in this area that Copeland first developed her interest in archaeology.

Archaeology
Copeland worked in the field of Palaeolithic archaeology for over fifty years, and was associated with the University College London Institute of Archaeology. She was an adviser to the Stone Age Institute. In 2004 the festschrift "From the River to the Sea: The Palaeolithic and the Neolithic on the Euphrates and in the Northern Levant " was published in her honour.

Family
Copeland married Miles on 25 September 1942 at St Mary's Church, Great Portland Street, London. The couple had four children, all of whom went on to have notable careers; their eldest son Miles Copeland III (born 2 May 1944) as an executive in the entertainment industry, Ian Copeland (born 25 April 1949) as a music promoter and booking agent, Lorraine "Lennie" Copeland as a writer and film producer, and Stewart Copeland (born 16 July 1952) as a musician best known as the drummer for the band The Police. Her husband Miles died on 14 January 1991, and her son Ian predeceased her in May 2006. Lorraine Copeland died at Chateau Marouatte in Dordogne, France, on 27 April 2013. She is buried next to her husband Miles in the churchyard of St Peter and St Paul's Church, Aston Rowant, Oxfordshire.

Partial bibliography
Copeland, Lorraine and Waechter, John (1968) "The Stone Industries of Abri Bergy, Lebanon" Bulletin of the Institute of Archaeology, University of London 7, 15–36.
Copeland, Lorraine (1975) "The Middle and Upper Paleolithic of Lebanon and Syria in the Light of Recent Research" in Fred Wendorf and Anthony E. Marks, eds., Problems in Prehistory: North Africa and the Levant Dallas.
Copeland, Lorraine and Hours, Francis (eds) (1989) The Hammer on the Rock: Studies in the Early Palaeolithic of Azraq, Jordan. Maison de L'Orient Méditerranéen C.N.R.S.-Université Lumière-Lyon 2, Lyon, France, Archaeological Series No. 5 BAR S540. .
Sanlaville, Paul; Besançon, Jacques; Copeland, Lorraine and Muhesen, Sultan (1993) Le Paléolithique de la vallée moyenne de l'Oronte (Syrie): peuplement et environment BAR S587. .
Copeland, Lorraine and Moloney, Norah (eds) (1998) The Mousterian Site of Ras el-Kelb, Lebanon BAR IS 706. .

Related publications
Aurenche, Olivier; Le Mière, Marie and Sanlaville, Paul (eds) (2004) From the River to the Sea: The Paleolithic and the Neolithic on the Euphrates and in the Northern Levant. Studies in honour of Lorraine Copeland Maison de l'Orient Méditerranéen BAR S1263 . A full bibliography of Lorraine Copeland's work is provided in this volume.

References

Sources
 "In Memoriam. Lorraine Copeland (1921-2013)", Andrew N. Garrard, and Olivier Aurenche and Paul Sanlaville, 2014, Paléorient 40:1, pp 5–8. Online at Lorraine Copeland (1921-2013).
 Copeland, Miles (1989) The Game Player: Confessions of the CIA's Original Political Operative London

1921 births
2013 deaths
British archaeologists
British women archaeologists
People associated with the UCL Institute of Archaeology
British Special Operations Executive personnel
People educated at Wycombe Abbey
Members of the Order of the British Empire
The Police
Copeland family